The 2009 Boston Marathon was the 113rd running of the annual marathon race in Boston, United States and was held on April 20. The elite men's race was won by Ethiopia's Deriba Merga in a time of 2:08:42 hours and the women's race was won by Ethiopia's Salina Kosgei in 2:32:16.

Results

Men

Women

References

Men's results. Association of Road Racing Statisticians. Retrieved 2020-04-10.
Women's results. Association of Road Racing Statisticians. Retrieved 2020-04-10.

External links

 Official website

Boston Marathon
Boston
Boston Marathon
Marathon
Boston Marathon